The Politician's Love Story is a 1909 short drama film directed by D. W. Griffith for the Biograph Company.

Cast
Mack Sennett - Boss Tim Crogan
Kathlyn Williams - Extra
Lee Dougherty -
Marion Leonard - Peter, Cartoonist
Florence Lawrence - 
Herbert Prior - Crogan's Friend

uncredited
Linda Arvidson - Woman, Third Couple
George Gebhardt - Newspaper Employee
D. W. Griffith - Man, First Couple
Anita Hendrie - Woman, Fourth Couple
Arthur V. Johnson - Newspaper Employee, Male, Third Couple
Florence La Badie
David Miles - Newspaper Employee, Man Fourth Couple
Barry O'Moore - Newspaper Employee (*billed Herbert Yost)
Alfred Paget

See also
D. W. Griffith filmography

References

External links

The Politician's Love Story available for free download at Internet Archive

1909 films
1909 drama films
Silent American drama films
American silent short films
Films directed by D. W. Griffith
Biograph Company films
American black-and-white films
1909 short films
1900s English-language films
1900s American films